MotorSport Ranch is an American reality television series created by Alexander Muse.  The show centers on a real-life country club where instead of a golf course or tennis courts, the members have access to two world class road courses. MotorSport Ranch is located in the Dallas Fort Worth Metroplex, complete with trackside homes, full outfitted racing garages, a multi-level clubhouse and more than 400 active members.   Produced by Robert Bennett, Alexander Muse and Scott Ryan, the pilot originally aired on INHD and the series premiered on VOOM's Rush HD HDTV channel.

Format

First Episode (2-hour pilot)— Introduction to MotorSport Ranch.  Set the scene.  Meet the Ranch-owner, Ranch-hands, the Club Pro, the banker, the investors and the prevailing Title-holder or “top gun.”  Briefly meet each competing member both on- and off-track and behold his (or her) spectacular car or motorcycle.  Initial competition: “Show Down, 1.”  Several drivers are eliminated based on various factors.  Tease season's future episodes.

Next Episodes— Set the Scene:  Brief visual review: concept of MotorSport Ranch as a country club.  Re-introduce the Ranch-owner, Ranch-hands and the Club Pro.  Meet the Members:  Remaining eccentric, affluent members and their dream cars profiled.  Viewers are granted a glimpse into their opulent real worlds.
Practice:  Members prepare for The Show Down.  Viewers are compelled to select and root for their favorites including phone and web voting, SMS, and public events.  
Dinner party:  Members meet and interact in a posh social setting the night before The Show Down.  Dinner party theme and menu will vary. The Show Down:  The two part, climatic, electrifying weekly race!  Length and style will vary. Spotlight on the Winner:  Cocktail after-party.  Victor is toasted by members/staff.  The spine-tingling elimination.

See also
MotorSport Ranch

External links
 
 Entrepreneur Magazine Mention
 Black Enterprise Magazine Mention
 1tail Resource Database: MotorSport Ranch
 Business Week Mention
 New York Times

2005 American television series debuts
2007 American television series endings
2000s American game shows